Most of the colleges forming the University of Cambridge and University of Oxford are paired into sister colleges across the two universities. The extent of the arrangement differs from case to case, but commonly includes the right to dine at one's sister college, the right to book accommodation there, the holding of joint events between JCRs and invitations to May balls.

Trinity College, Dublin a sister of both Oriel College, Oxford and St John's College, Cambridge is unique in being the only non-Oxbridge institution to have sister status with an Oxbridge college.

Most of the pairings reflect similarities between the two colleges concerned, often parallel histories. For example, University College, Oxford (an ancient and prestigious college, founded 1249) is paired with Trinity Hall, Cambridge (of equivalent reputation, founded 1350). William Wykeham's statutes for New College, Oxford, founded in 1379, formed the basis of the foundation of its sister college, King's College, Cambridge. The two Colleges both share distinguished choral reputations. Founded by scholars from Merton College, one of Oxford's oldest colleges (founded 1264), Peterhouse (Cambridge, 1284) is Cambridge's first college. Similarly, Somerville College, Oxford (founded in 1879 as a women's institution) has Girton College, Cambridge (also historically a women's college, founded 1869) as its sister college. St Catherine's College, Oxford (the most recent undergraduate college in Oxford, founded 1963) is paired with Robinson College, Cambridge (the newest Cambridge college, founded 1977).

Oriel College and St Hugh's College, Oxford currently each dispute the other's claim to sister-college status with Clare College, Cambridge. While Oriel and Clare share a common founding year of 1326 and a long history of association, in the 1980s the newly coeducational Clare associated with the then female-only St. Hugh's to protest against Oriel's remaining all male. Today both St. Hugh's and Oriel are coeducational.

See also
 Colleges of the University of Oxford
 Colleges of the University of Cambridge
Seven Sisters (colleges)
 College rivalry
 Oxbridge

References 

Oxbridge sister colleges
Sister colleges
Sister colleges
Sister colleges
Oxbridge sister colleges
University of Oxford-related lists